Gollumjapyx smeagol is a species of dipluran, named after Gollum, a fictional character from J. R. R. Tolkien's legendarium. It was first discovered in caves in the Spanish province of Castellón.

References

Diplura
Fauna of the Iberian Peninsula
Endemic fauna of Spain
Monotypic arthropod genera
Cave arthropods
Organisms named after Tolkien and his works